The 1928–29 Swiss National Ice Hockey Championship was the 19th edition of the national ice hockey championship in Switzerland. HC Davos won the championship as HC Rosey Gstaad forfeited the final.

First round

Eastern Series 
HC Davos qualified for the final.

Western Series 
HC Rosey Gstaad qualified for the final.

Final 
 HC Davos - HC Rosey Gstaad 5:0 Forfeit

External links 
Swiss Ice Hockey Federation – All-time results

National
Swiss National Ice Hockey Championship seasons